Litton is a village and civil parish in Littondale in the Yorkshire Dales in England.  It lies in the Craven District of North Yorkshire,  up Littondale from Arncliffe. From Litton a footpath leads  over the fells to the north east to Buckden in Wharfedale.  The population of the civil parish was estimated at 70 in 2015.

The centre of the village is an old public house, the Queens Arms, that dates back to the 17th century. Associated with the Queens Arms since 2003 is the Lamb Brewing Company (previously the Litton Brewery) that brews Litton Ale.

Litton was mentioned in the Domesday Book of 1086 (as Litone).  The name probably comes from the Old English hlið "hillside" and tūn "farmstead".

Litton was historically a township in the ancient parish of Arncliffe, part of Staincliffe Wapentake in the West Riding of Yorkshire.  Litton became a separate civil parish in 1866.  The parish was transferred to the new county of North Yorkshire in 1974.

References

External links

Yorkshire Images site for Litton
Queens Arms site

Villages in North Yorkshire
Civil parishes in North Yorkshire